Shunko is a 1960 Argentine film directed by Lautaro Murúa. It won the Silver Condor Award for Best Film.

In a survey of the 100 greatest films of Argentine cinema carried out by the Museo del Cine Pablo Ducrós Hicken in 2000, the film reached the 16th position.

Plot
The argument is about the relationship between a teacher (Lautaro Murúa), educated in the big city, who is assigned to a rural school in the province of Santiago del Estero, in which the students are Quechua speakers. Initially the ethnocentric prejudices of the teacher and his ignorance of the Quechua culture and the children, lead him to enter into conflict with his students and to distance himself from them. Little by little it is the teacher who begins to learn from his students and establish a relationship of respect and mutual learning.

Cast
 Lautaro Murúa
 Raúl del Valle
 Fanny Olivera
 Orlando Sacha
 Gabriela Schóo
 Ángel Greco
 Graciela Rueda
 Marta Roldán
 Oscar Llompart
 Raúl Parini
 Ramón del Valle García
 Guillermina Rosenstein
 Beatriz Abre
 Angélica Monti

References

External links
 

1960 films
1960s Spanish-language films
Argentine black-and-white films
1960s Argentine films